The Canterbury Rugby Football Union (also referred to as "Canterbury" or "CRFU") is the governing body for rugby union in a portion of the Canterbury region of New Zealand. Its colours are red and black in a hooped design. The CRFU govern the running of the Canterbury representative team which have won New Zealand's first-tier domestic competition National Provincial Championship (Air New Zealand Cup and ITM Cup) 14 times including a "six-peat" from 2008 to 2013 – with five in the National Provincial Championship, two in the Air New Zealand Cup, five in the ITM Cup and one in the Mitre 10 Cup. Their most recent victory was the 2017 Mitre 10 Cup. Canterbury also acts as a primary feeder to the Crusaders, who play in the Super Rugby competition.

The union also administers all club rugby within the region, including senior club rugby and school rugby. Canterbury has a proud history producing All Blacks, the most of any New Zealand region, with Scott Barrett becoming Canterbury's 200th All Black.

History

Early history (1879–1975)

The Canterbury Rugby Football Union (CRFU) was established in 1879 following a match between South Canterbury and North Canterbury in Timaru. It took place on 26 July 1879, where delegates representing Christchurch, Christ's College, Temuka, North Canterbury (Rangiora), Eastern (Christchurch), South Canterbury (Timaru), Ashburton, and Southbridge clubs decided to form the union. The impetus to form the CRFU was mainly provided by Montague Lewin, who had emigrated from England to Christchurch in 1873, and lobbied for local football clubs to adopt the rules of England's Rugby Football Union. He succeeded in getting Canterbury clubs to adopt the rugby rules in 1876, but a visit by an Australian Victorian Rules football team in 1879 prompted him to push for the formation of a union. It had been initially proposed that the new organisation be the New Zealand Rugby Union, but this was rejected and the Canterbury Rugby Football Union was formed. Canterbury was the first provincial union within New Zealand, with the Wellington Rugby Football Union was formed later that year. By 1890 fourteen provincial unions had been founded within New Zealand. As well as being the oldest union within New Zealand, the CRFU was actually founded before one of the Home Unions – the Welsh Rugby Union was founded in 1881.

A Canterbury representative side had played prior to the formation of the CRFU, but the first provincial game in New Zealand played under the authority of provincial unions took place on 27 August 1881. Canterbury hosted an Otago side that triumphed by a try to nil. The first rugby match at Lancaster Park was played the following year – a ground that would be the home of Canterbury rugby until the 2011 Christchurch earthquake.

Despite being instrumental in forming the CRFU, in 1888 the South Canterbury clubs broke off to form the South Canterbury Rugby Union – this comprised Timaru, Fairlie Creek, Geraldine, Temuka, Waimate, Winchester, and Timaru Pirate clubs. The occurred only a few years prior to the formation of the New Zealand Rugby Football Union (later shortened to New Zealand Rugby Union, or NZRU) in 1892. The CRFU had originally voted to join the NZRU in 1891, but when time came to ratify the agreement in 1892, they resisted following reluctance from their members. Along with the Otago and Southland provinces, the CRFU objected to the requirement that NZRU executive committee members reside in Wellington. South Canterbury had joined the NZRU, and the provinces representative sides did not meet in 1893. As well as this, players from Canterbury were not eligible for selection in the 1893 New Zealand team that toured Australia. The CRFU eventually relented, and in 1894 joined the NZRU; both Otago and Southland joined the following year. When New South Wales toured New Zealand in 1894, Canterbury players were now eligible for selection for New Zealand, and the CRFU hosted the only game between the sides which was played at Lancaster Park.

In 1904 a sub-union of the South Canterbury Rugby Union was formed around the Ashburton area – the Ashburton Country Rugby Union. In 1905 it came under the umbrella of the CRFU, but split away to become completely independent in 1927. It was renamed the Mid Canterbury Rugby Football Union in 1952.

National provincial championship (1976–2005)

The National Provincial Championship was founded in 1976, becoming the premier national rugby competition. The NPC did not have playoffs, with the Championship awarded to the team with the best record. Canterbury had immediate success in the competition, going undefeated in 1977 to win the title. Canterbury had mixed results for the next five years, finishing between 2nd and 9th during this period. In 1983 Canterbury won their second title, once again going undefeated.

Canterbury teams did not win the title again, until 1997. All Black laden Auckland teams constantly proved superior to Canterbury, claiming 10 titles from 1984 to 1996. The 1984 and 1989 Canterbury teams had a record of 8 wins, 1 draw and 1 loss, and finished second to Auckland.

In 1992, the National Provincial Championship established playoffs, with the top four sides playing in a knockout format. In 1992 and 1993 Canterbury missed the playoffs. In 1994, Canterbury placed 3rd during the regular season. Canterbury travelled to North Harbour for the semi-final. Canterbury lost 27–59 to North Harbour. In 1995, Canterbury missed the playoffs again. Canterbury began to see the development of important players such as Andrew Mehrtens, Todd Blackadder and Reuben Thorne. Despite losing three of the first four games Canterbury rebounded to finish 3rd in 1996. However, Canterbury lost away to Counties Manukau 33–46 in the semi-final. In the 1997 season Canterbury broke their championship drought, winning their third title. Canterbury posted a record of 8 wins and 2 losses, enough to finish 2nd in the round robin. Canterbury defeated Auckland 21–15 in the semi-final. Canterbury also hosted the final owing to Counties Manukau, upsetting Waikato 43–40 in the other semi-final. Canterbury defeated Counties Manukau 44–13 in the final.

In 1998, Canterbury finished 3rd in the round robin, with a record of 6 wins and 4 losses. Canterbury travelled to Hamilton to play Waikato in the semi-final. Canterbury lost 13–32 to Waikato in the semi-final. The 1999 season saw Canterbury missing the playoffs, finishing 5th. Canterbury had a record of 5 wins and 4 losses. In 2000, Canterbury finished 1st in the round robin with a record of 8 wins and 1 loss. Canterbury defeated Taranaki 31–23 in the semi-final. Canterbury lost the final to Wellington 29–34 in Christchurch. In 2001, Canterbury won their fourth title. Canterbury posted a record of 9 wins and 1 loss, finishing 1st in the round robin. Canterbury defeated Auckland in the semi-final 53–22. Canterbury hosted Otago in the final, defeating Otago 30–19.

In the 2002 Canterbury finished 2nd in the round robin, with a record of 7 wins and 2 losses. Canterbury hosted Auckland in the semi-final. However, Auckland beat Canterbury 23–29 in the semi-final. In 2003 season, Canterbury did not qualify for the playoffs, posting a record of 5 wins, 1 draw and 3 losses. The 2003 season is currently the last time Canterbury has missed the playoffs. In 2004, Canterbury won its fifth title, defeating Wellington in the final. Canterbury finished 2nd in the round robin after posting a record of 6 wins, 1 draw and 2 losses. Canterbury hosted Bay of Plenty in Christchurch. Canterbury defeated Bay of Plenty 44–12 in the semi-final. Wellington hosted the final against Canterbury. Canterbury defeated Wellington 40–27 in the final, with Justin Marshall scoring two tries.

2005 was the last season of the National Provincial Championship before it became the Air New Zealand Cup. Canterbury finished 1st in the round robin, posting a record of 7 wins, 1 draw and 1 loss. Canterbury hosted Otago in the semi-final, in the battle of the South Island. Otago beat Canterbury 22–37, ending Canterbury's season.

Air New Zealand Cup (2006–2009)

In 2006 the National Provincial Championship became the Air New Zealand Cup, as Air New Zealand airline company became the principal sponsor of the tournament and earned naming rights. During the Air New Zealand Cup era, unexpected Canterbury dominance would begin to emerge. The 2006 season was not very successful for Canterbury. Canterbury posted a record of 6 wins and 3 losses, placing Canterbury 5th in the Top Six division. Canterbury would have to travel to Wellington for the quarter-final. Wellington defeated Canterbury 23–36 in the quarter-final. In 2007, Canterbury finished 2nd in the round robin, behind the undefeated Auckland. Canterbury hosted Wellington in the semi-final. However, Wellington closely defeat Canterbury 21–26.

The 2008 season would begin Canterbury's unprecedented dynasty. Canterbury recorded 9 wins and 1 loss, to finish 2nd behind Wellington. Canterbury hosted Tasman in the quarter-final. Canterbury beat Tasman 48–10. In the semi-final Canterbury hosted Hawke's Bay, defeating Hawke's Bay 31–21. For the final Canterbury travelled to Wellington to face the top seed Wellington. In a low-scoring final, Canterbury won 7–6, earning its first Air New Zealand Cup title and sixth title overall.

The 2009 season continued Canterbury's success, in the round robin Canterbury finished 1st after posting a record of 10 wins and 3 losses. Canterbury hosted Hawke's Bay, the best attacking team in the competition. Canterbury defeated Hawke's Bay 20–3 in the semi-final. Canterbury faced Wellington again in the final. In a closely fought match, Canterbury won with a penalty in the 78th minute. Canterbury defeated Wellington 28–20. For the first time Canterbury won titles back to back.

ITM Cup (2010–2015)

In 2010 the Air New Zealand Cup became the ITM Cup as ITM gained the naming rights, after becoming the principal sponsor. Canterbury tied Auckland with 45 points during the round robin, but managed to top the table after having a better points differential than Auckland. Canterbury hosted the semi-final against Wellington. In a high scoring match, Canterbury outdueled Wellington 57–41. Canterbury faced Waikato the 3rd seed, after Waikato upset Auckland 38–37 in the other semi-final. Canterbury defeated Waikato in the final 33–13. Canterbury earned its first ITM Cup title and eighth title overall. Canterbury achieved its first threepeat, only the second province (Auckland) to accomplish this.

Due to the 2011 Rugby World Cup, there would be no semi-finals to allow more time for the world cup. As a result, only the top two sides would qualify for a final. Canterbury posted a record of 6 wins and 4 losses, allowing Canterbury to finish as the 2nd seed. Despite Taranaki having 7 wins and 3 losses, Canterbury qualified because it had more competition points, Taranaki (31), Canterbury (33). Canterbury had to travel to Hamilton to face Waikato in the final for the second time in two years. Canterbury defeated Waikato 12–3, with both teams only able to score through penalty's. Canterbury earned its ninth title and equalled Auckland's feat of a fourpeat.

The 2012 season was another successful year for Canterbury. Canterbury tied with Wellington on 39 competition points, but finished top of the table due to better points differential. Canterbury faced Taranaki in the semi-final. Despite being expected to win easily, Taranaki, at full-time the score was tied at 27–27, forcing extra-time. In extra-time Canterbury's superior fitness paid dividends, running out to a 51–27 victory. Canterbury hosted Auckland in the 2012 final. Canterbury beat the Auckland team 31–18. Canterbury become the first team to win five titles in a row, a feat not even Auckland managed in their golden years. Canterbury earned its tenth title.

In 2013, Canterbury become the first team to win six title in a row. Canterbury finished 2nd in the round robin behind Wellington, after posting a record of 8 wins and 2 losses. Canterbury hosted Auckland in the semi-final. In an offensive game, Canterbury beat Auckland 56–26. Canterbury faced Wellington away in the final. Canterbury defeated Wellington 29–13. Canterbury made history by winning six title in a row.

In 2014, Canterbury's streak came to an end. Canterbury posted a record of 7 wins and 3 losses, finishing 3rd in the round robin. Canterbury had to travel to Nelson, to play Tasman. Canterbury was beaten by Tasman 6–26.

In the 2015 season Canterbury won its twelfth title. Canterbury finished top of the table, recording 9 wins and 1 loss. Canterbury faced Taranaki in the semi-final. Canterbury defeated Taranaki in a dominant display 46–20. Canterbury hosted old foes Auckland in the final. In a closely fought match, Canterbury prevailed 25–23.

Mitre 10 Cup (2016–2021)

In 2016 the ITM Cup become the Mitre 10 Cup, as Mitre 10 become the principal sponsor, gaining the naming rights. Canterbury finished top of the table after posting a record of 8 wins and 2 losses. Canterbury hosted fourth seed Counties Manukau in the semi-final. Canterbury defeated Counties Manukau 22–7. Canterbury then faced Tasman in the 2016 final. Canterbury defeated Tasman comfortably 43–27, going back to back and earning a thirteenth title.

In 2017 Mitre 10 Cup season, Canterbury finished second in the round robin after posting a record of 8 wins and 2 losses. Canterbury performed well throughout the season, but was defeated heavily on two occasions. Canterbury lost 14–60 to Wellington in week 5 and 43–55 to Taranaki in week 9. Canterbury won the other 8 games by an average margin of 32 points. Canterbury also lost the Ranfurly Shield to Taranaki. Canterbury Captain Tim Bateman stated after the game only winning the competition would help alleviate the loss of the shield. Canterbury hosted a resurgent North Harbour for the first semi-final. North Harbour had won promotion from the Championship the year earlier. Canterbury defeated North Harbour 35–24, advancing to the final. Tasman upset the table topping Taranaki in the other semi final 30–29. As a result, the final would be hosted in Christchurch between Canterbury and Tasman. Canterbury defeated Tasman 35–13, sealing the match with a try in the 77th minute. Canterbury won its fourteenth title overall and ninth title in ten years.

In 2018, they opened with a 25–17 loss to Tasman, beat Wellington (27–20), Bay of Plenty (19–31), Manawatu (34–23), North Harbour (21–31). But it all came to an end with a 29–34 loss to Auckland but started again with a 25–47 win over Otago, They beat Hawke's Bay (49–24), Taranaki (41–7) and Counties Manukau (14–19) to finish 3rd on the table, behind Auckland and Tasman. In the semi finals, they were hosted by second place Tasman, winning 16–21 in the 76th minute. The game was considered a deserved, but controversially won match by Canterbury. They played Auckland in the final, away again. Despite looking to go for an easy win, they were held in the second half, the match ending 26–26. The match went into extra time, where they lost 40–33, ending their perfect finals attendance.

Ranfurly Shield (1903–present)

The Ranfurly Shield was donated by the Uchter Knox, 5th Earl of Ranfurly, the governor of New Zealand (1897–1904). The shield had been designed as a trophy for football (not rugby) and had to be modified to depict a rugby game. The Shield is based on a challenge system, rather than a league or knockout competition as with most football trophies. The holding union must defend the shield in challenge matches, and a successful challenger becomes the new holder of the Shield. It was first awarded to Auckland, which had the best results in the 1903 season. In the first challenge on 6 August 1904, Wellington defeated Auckland 6–3 to lift what has become known colloquially as the Log o’ Wood.

Canterbury has a proud history associated with the Ranfurly Shield. Canterbury has 15 Ranfurly Shield wins and 136 defences, second only to Auckland. Canterbury's first bid for the trophy in its second game in 1904, and challenged for the shield on 11 occasions before it was finally successful for a first time, when beating Manawhenua (an amalgamation of the modern day Manawatu and Horowhenua Kapiti provincial unions) 17–6 at Palmerston North. Canterbury's first shield tenure of any length began in 1931 and ended in 1934 after 15 successful defences. Between 1953 and 1956 the Cantabs held onto the shield in 23 challenges. In 1973 Marlborough pulled off one of the greatest Ranfurly Shield upsets of all time, by defeating Canterbury 13–6 to begin the region’s only shield tenure. Canterbury's greatest shield defence occurred from 1982–1985, with 25 defences. Canterbury defeated Wellington on 18 September 1982 gaining the Ranfurly Shield for the first time in nine years. Canterbury would defend the shield for a then record number 25 times before Auckland would challenge on 14 September 1985. In front of 52,000 fans Auckland started strongly, jumping out to a 24–0 half-time lead. However, Alex Wyllie's Canterbury came back at the last minute when a Robbie Deans kick bounded over the dead ball line. Having held on to win 28–23, Auckland set about creating a new benchmark of 61 consecutive defences.

Canterbury reclaimed the shield in 1994, defeating Waikato 29–26. Canterbury would have nine successful defences, before losing the shield to Auckland in 1995. Auckland would shutout Canterbury 35–0. In 2000, Canterbury challenged Waikato, who had successfully defended the shield 21 times. Canterbury defeated Waikato 26–18, winning the shield for the tenth time. Canterbury successfully defended the shield 23 times before losing to Auckland 40–31. However, next year Canterbury got a challenge, as Bay of Plenty took the shield of Auckland. In 2004, Canterbury would challenge Bay of Plenty for the shield. Canterbury won 33–26 over Bay of Plenty. Canterbury mounted 14 successful defences, until Canterbury lost to North Harbour 17–21. On 1 September, Canterbury defeated Waikato 33–20, winning back the shield. However, Canterbury had only one defence of the shield, losing to Auckland 15–26. Just under two years after losing the shield to Auckland, Canterbury regained it, beating Wellington 36–14. Canterbury again were host to a mighty upset as  regained the Shield for the fifth time in their history after a 50-year hiatus stretching back to 1959, with Southland winning 3–9. Canterbury got revenge on Southland prevailing in a sold out game 26–15 in round 11 of the 2010 ITM Cup.  received much praise for breathing life back into the shield, for their passionate ownership of the shield. Canterbury would only defend the shield twice before losing to Southland again, 19–22 returning the shield to the south.

In 2016, Canterbury would challenge Waikato for the shield in round 7. The two teams were locked up at 23–23 with only 10 minutes remaining. However, Jordie Barrett kicked two penalties to seal a Canterbury win 29–23, gaining the Ranfurly Shield in the process. Canterbury would defend the shield on 7 occasions before losing to Taranaki 43–55.

Stadium

Canterbury's main home ground was the 36,000-capacity AMI Stadium in Christchurch, formally known as Lancaster Park. However, they stopped playing there after the 2010 season due to damage inflicted by the February Christchurch earthquake.
With AMI Stadium damaged, Canterbury adopted Rugby League Park (currently known as Orangetheory Stadium) in Addington as their home ground. The facility was upgraded bringing it to an 18,600 capacity and its facilities to the minimum standards required for the Mitre 10 competition.

Christchurch is hopeful a new roofed multi-use arena will be constructed by 2022 with a capacity of 25,000, providing a world class venue for sports and entertainment events including Crusaders, All Blacks and Canterbury games. On 5 October 2020, NZ Prime Minister Jacinda Ardern announced that a funding agreement had been signed with the Christchurch City Council.

Honours

NPC/Air New Zealand Cup/ITM Cup/Mitre 10 Cup (14):

1977, 1983, 1997, 2001, 2004, 2008, 2009, 2010, 2011, 2012, 2013, 2015, 2016, 2017
Ranfurly Shield 

1927–28 (1), 1931–34 (15), 1935 (4), 1950 (0), 1953–56 (23), 1969–71 (9), 1972–73 (2), 1982–85 (25), 1994–95 (9), 2000–03 (23), 2004–06 (14), 2007 (1), 2009 (4), 2010–11 (2), 2016–17 (7).

Season standings

Rivalries

Auckland

Canterbury's greatest rivalry is with the 'old foe' Auckland, as both teams constantly battle for titles and have a long bitter history. Canterbury is the largest province in the South Island and Auckland is the largest province in the North Island. Games between the two have taken on the added intensity of North versus South and city versus country. Auckland dominated the New Zealand rugby landscape during the 1980s and 1990s, often at Canterbury's expense. However, in recent times Canterbury has turned the table, defeating Auckland in two finals in the past five years. Canterbury has even began to challenge Auckland's status as New Zealand's most successful province. Canterbury's 14 titles, 15 Ranfurly Shields wins with 139 defences, is closing on Auckland's 17 titles, 16 Ranfurly Shields wins with 148 defences.

Other representative teams
In addition to the Men's 1st XV, the CRFU has a number of other representative teams for both Men and Women. Their Women's team is part of the Women's Provincial Championship.

Club rugby
The Country Cup is the premier club competition over the Canterbury Country region. The region includes clubs from the Ellesmere and North Canterbury sub-unions and the Mid Canterbury Rugby Football Union. Players who compete in this tournament are eligible for selection in the Canterbury Country representative team.

It is a 19 team competition with teams divided into two sections, ten teams in section 1 and nine teams in section 2. It is a round robin format, with every team playing each other once and a bonus points system being used to rank the teams. The top four sides from each section go one to the quarter-finals, and the winners from these go to the semi-finals – the two winners then compete for the Cup in the final.

Hawkins Cup
The Hawkins Cup is the premier club competition of the Metropolitan sub-union. There are currently three divisions under the Hawkins name, as well as a fourth division, a colts, and a classics grade. All formats are similar and the trophies include the Trophy, Plate and Bowl.

Division One has twelve teams competing in 2013 competition. Each team plays one another once in a round robin format that lasts eleven rounds. The top side at the end of the round robin receives the Hawkins Cup. Following the Cup competition, the teams are divided into two sections, with the top six teams in one section, and the bottom six in the other. Each section then plays a round robin of five matches. The top four teams from division one then enter a play-off for the Trophy; the bottom two teams from division one and the top two from division two enter a play-off for the Plate; and the bottom four teams from division two enter a play-off for the Bowl.

The Second Division operates under a similar format to Division One, with a full round robin to determine the winner of the Cup, before splitting into two divisions that eventually compete for the Trophy, Plate, and Bowl. The Premier Colts operates under a double round robin format; the winner is awarded the Cup. The teams are split into three based on their rankings following the double round robin; the top four teams compete for the Trophy in a set of play-off matches. The teams ranked fifth to eighth compete for the Plate.

Clubs
The Canterbury Union consists of 48 clubs, the most of any other New Zealand Union, split into three sub-unions, Ellesmere, North Canterbury and Metropolitan.

Ellesmere:
There are 16 clubs in the Ellesmere Sub-Union.

North Canterbury:
There are 14 clubs in the North Canterbury Sub-Union.

Metropolitan:
There are 18 clubs in the Metropolitan Sub-Union.

Bunnings NPC

All Blacks
This is a list of players who have represented New Zealand from the Canterbury representative rugby union team. Players are listed by the decade they were first selected in and players in bold are current All Blacks. This list is taken from allblacks.com Stats

1880–99

1900–19

1920–39

1940–59

1960–79

1980–99

2000–19

2020–

See also
 Rugby union in New Zealand
 Structure of rugby union in New Zealand

Citations

Sources

External links
Official site
Supporters Club
AMI Stadium Site

New Zealand rugby union teams
New Zealand rugby union governing bodies
Sport in Canterbury, New Zealand
Sports organizations established in 1879
1879 establishments in New Zealand